was a Japanese photographer.

References

Japanese photographers
1907 births
1986 deaths